Gloucestershire Notes and Queries was an illustrated quarterly magazine of the history and antiquities of Gloucestershire published from 1879 under the editorship of the Reverend Beaver Henry Blacker (1821–90). The first volume was published in 1881. After the death of Blacker, the editor was the solicitor, genealogist, and publisher, William Phillimore Watts Phillimore, founder of the eponymous publishing firm.

Volumes
Volumes were published as follows:
Volume I, 1879–81. Editor Rev. Beaver H. Blacker
Volume II, 1882–84. Editor Rev. Beaver H. Blacker
Volume III, 1885–87. Editor Rev. Beaver H. Blacker
Volume IV, 1888–90. Editor Rev. Beaver H. Blacker
Volume V. 1891-1893. 1894. Editor W. P. W. Phillimore
Volume VI, 1894–95.
Volume VII, 1896–97.
Volume VIII, 1901.
Volume IX, 1902.

References 

Quarterly magazines published in the United Kingdom
19th century in Bristol
History of Gloucestershire
Magazines established in 1879
Magazines disestablished in 1902
Print media in Bristol
Mass media in Gloucestershire
Defunct magazines published in the United Kingdom
History magazines published in the United Kingdom